The following is a list of Clemson Tigers softball seasons. Clemson University is a member of the Atlantic Coast Conference of the NCAA Division I.  The Tigers began varsity play in 2020.  In their first full season, they won the ACC regular season, reached the ACC Tournament final, and appeared in their first NCAA Regional.

References

Clemson
Clemson Tigers softball seasons